The Love of a Queen is a 1923 German silent historical drama film directed by Ludwig Wolff and starring Harry Liedtke, Henny Porten and Walter Janssen. It is based on the eighteenth century affair between the Danish Queen Caroline Matilda and the court physician Johann Friedrich Struensee.

The film's sets were designed by the art director Heinrich Beisenherz and Fritz Seyffert.

Cast
Harry Liedtke as Johann Friedrich Struensee
Henny Porten as The Queen
Walter Janssen as Der König
Olga Limburg as Queen-Widow
Annemarie Mörike as Court lady
Friedrich Kayßler
Hermann Vallentin
Louis Ralph
Adele Sandrock
Erna Hauk
Rudolf Biebrach
Max Gülstorff
Louis V. Arco

See also
The Dictator (1935)
King in Shadow (1957)
A Royal Affair (2012)

References

External links

Films of the Weimar Republic
German silent feature films
Films directed by Ludwig Wolff
German black-and-white films
1920s historical films
German historical films
Bavaria Film films
Films set in the 1760s
Films set in the 1770s
Films set in Denmark
Films set in Copenhagen
Biographical films about royalty
Adultery in films
Cultural depictions of Christian VII of Denmark
Cultural depictions of Caroline Matilda of Great Britain
1920s German films